Ivan "Ironman" Stewart's Super Off Road is an arcade video game released in 1989 by Leland Corporation. The game was designed and managed by John Morgan who was also lead programmer, and endorsed by professional off-road racer Ivan Stewart. Virgin Games produced several home versions in 1990. In 1991, a home console version for the Nintendo Entertainment System was later released by Leland's Tradewest subsidiary, followed by versions for most major home formats including the Master System, Genesis, Super NES, Amiga, and MS-DOS. A port for the Atari Jaguar was announced but never released. Some of the ports removed Ivan Stewart's name from the title due to licensing issues and are known simply as Super Off Road.

Gameplay

In the game, up to three players (four in the NES version through use of either the NES Satellite or NES Four Score) compete against each other or the computer in racing around several top-view indoor off-road truck tracks of increasing difficulty. There are eight different tracks (twelve in the SMS version and sixteen in the SNES version) and 99 races altogether on most versions (the SNES version loops through 64 races without ending). All races are raced more than once. First place results earn the player points to continue in the championship and money with which to upgrade their truck or buy more nitro. The goal is to reach the end of the season with the most money earned. Continues are available but whereas players can get extra money in the arcade version, in the home versions, the player's money is reset to zero. This is one of the first games where the player could upgrade their vehicle by earning points or money, an idea conceived by John Morgan (although in Atari Games' Sprint series, the player could upgrade their racer using wrenches), a system that is used in many racing games today. The Spectrum version of the game was voted number 47 in the Your Sinclair Readers' Top 100 Games of All Time. The game was ranked the 35th best game of all time by Amiga Power. MegaTech gave the game a score of 83%

Licensing
In the original arcade game, the red, blue, and yellow CPU trucks were 'driven' by "Madman" Sam Powell, "Hurricane" Earl Stratton, and "Jammin'" John Morgan, respectively. The names were taken from the development staff: Sam composed the music. John was the game designer and manager, lead programmer, initial track designer and wrote ray tracing software to create all vehicle art. Earl was the assistant software programmer, Hartono Titro was diagnostics programmer. The Track Pack added "Steamin'" Steve High and "Hot Rod" John Rowe, representing graphics and company ownership, respectively. By using these names, this meant that further licensing deals were not required.

The Super NES version was notable for prominently featuring the Toyota brand; the name and logo were displayed on various tracks and pre-race music was inspired by the "I love what you do for me Toyota" jingle that was used by the company's marketing campaign at the time of the game's release. This version also lacked any licensing or reference to Ivan Stewart, replacing him instead with the late Mickey Thompson in the gray truck (primarily without approval from Danny Thompson). The NES version does have the Toyota label on its cartridge art, but otherwise the ad is not present.

The game was not originally developed or published by Williams, Midway, or Atari Games, but by the Leland Corporation (which was acquired by WMS Industries, the holding company of said developers, in 1994). Both the arcade version of the game and its Track Pack upgrade can be found in Midway Arcade Treasures 3 for the PlayStation 2 and Xbox. However, it does not have the "Ironman" Ivan Stewart license and as such is known simply as Super Off Road, with the white, computer-controlled car being "driven" by "'Lightning' Kevin Lydy" (in the original arcade cabinet, the white car is "driven" by Ivan Stewart), a real-life graphic designer on the original arcade game, continuing the previous tradition regarding the CPU drivers being named for its programmers.

Super Off Road was also included in the 2012 compilation Midway Arcade Origins for the PlayStation 3 and Xbox 360.

Upgrades

The Track Pack, released in 1989, is an add-on board for arcade units that contains eight brand new tracks: Shortcut, Cutoff Pass, Pig Bog, Rio Trio, Leapin' Lizards, Redoubt About, Boulder Hill, and Volcano Valley. It also features the brand new ability for players to choose between either the regular truck or the dune buggy, both computer generated by John Morgan; both vehicles have different characteristics accordingly and add a new element to the game.

Reception

Replay Magazine rated the arcade version #1 Dedicated Video in its 1989's Best Videos and Pins Special Report.

Sinclair User rated the arcade version an 8 out of 10 and recommended the game to anyone who enjoyed playing the Sprint games, calling Super Off Road "Super Sprint with dirt".

Electronic Gaming Monthly gave the Lynx version a 3.75 out of 10, commenting that though Super Off Road was an excellent arcade game, the choppy animation and scrolling in the Lynx version make it almost unplayable.

Sequels
Super Off Road gained a number of sequels, the first was titled Super Off Road: The Baja, programmed by John Morgan. It was released for the SNES in 1993 and is based on the Baja 1000 race. A Sega Mega Drive version of Off Road: The Baja was also planned but never released. The format was changed to a third-person camera instead of an overhead camera. In 1997, an arcade sequel, Off Road Challenge, was released, which again adopted the third-person 3D driving view, and was ported to the Nintendo 64 in 1998. The second sequel, Offroad Thunder, was released in arcades in 1999, but not ported to consoles until the release of Midway Arcade Treasures 3 in 2005.

References

External links

1989 video games
Amiga games
Amstrad CPC games
Arcade video games
Atari Lynx games
Atari ST games
Cancelled Atari Jaguar games
Commodore 64 games
DOS games
Game Boy games
Multiplayer and single-player video games
Nintendo Entertainment System games
Off-road racing video games
Game Gear games
Sega Genesis games
Master System games
Super Nintendo Entertainment System games
Telegames games
Top-down racing video games
ZX Spectrum games
Video games scored by Sam Powell
Video games scored by Tim Follin
Video games developed in the United States
NMS Software games
Graftgold games